Gymnastics events have been staged at the Olympic Games since 1896, with women competing for the time at the 1928 Olympic Games.  Sherine El-Zeiny became the first female Egyptian artistic gymnast to compete at the Olympic Games, doing so in 2008.  Since then Egypt has had at least one female gymnast at the Olympic Games.

Gymnasts

See also 
 Egypt women's national gymnastics team

References

Egypt
gymnasts
Olympic